Heartland is an unincorporated community located in Kaufman County, Texas, United States that was founded in 2006. The 2,000 acre master-planned community is located 25 miles east of Downtown Dallas and is part of the Dallas/Fort Worth Metroplex. The community includes a 35-acre stocked lake with a fishing pier, many hike and bike trails (designed to make it safer for children to walk to school), parks, a junior-olympic swimming pool, a playground, a baseball field, a soccer field and a basketball court. In 2009 Heartland was awarded community of the year by The Homebuilders Association  of Greater Dallas. Homes range from $270,000(s)- $550,000(s) and consistent of homes built by Bloomfield Homes, Lennar, Highland Homes, History Maker and Impression Homes. In July 2018 a new 6 million dollar amenity center was constructed, including a clubhouse, gym, and a large water park.

As of 2019 the community development is currently half completed, with home construction planned through 2030. A total of approximately 8,600 homes when completed.

Education
The community is served by the Crandall Independent School District.  There are currently three of seven planned schools within Heartland: Barbara Walker and Hollis T. Dietz Elementary Schools and Crandall Middle School.

References

Dallas–Fort Worth metroplex
Planned communities in the United States
Unincorporated communities in Kaufman County, Texas
Unincorporated communities in Texas